PH-1, PH 1, PH.1, PH1 or variant, may refer to:
 PH1 (Planet Hunters 1), a planet in the KIC 4862625 star system
 Hall PH-1, a model of the Hall PH airplane
 PH1, a postcode in the PH postcode area of the United Kingdom
 PH1, IAU Minor Planet Center nomenclature for naming asteroids
 1988 PH1, see 4768 Hartley
 1991 PH1
 1992 PH1, see 12320 Loschmidt
 1994 PH1, see (9391) 1994 PH1
 1999 PH1, see 19617 Duhamel
 pH-1 (rapper), a South Korean rapper
 PH-1, the official codename for the Essential Phone, Andy Rubin's first-generation Android device